Ramona Abish Young (born in Los Angeles, California) is an American actress. She is known for her recurring roles on the television series Man Seeking Woman, The Real O'Neals, and Santa Clarita Diet. Young is also known for her regular roles as Kaya on Z Nation, Mona Wu on Legends of Tomorrow and Eleanor on Never Have I Ever.

Early life 
Ramona was educated in both Hong Kong, her parents' homeland, and the United States off and on until she was eight years old. Young graduated early from California State University, Los Angeles and studied acting at Playhouse West. On her family, Young stated "I don’t have family in the business. My grandfather is an eastern doctor. My grandmother sold clothes on the sidewalk. My mother is in the Navy. My father is a psychologist and professor."

Career 
One of Young's first credited roles was an appearance in a 2014 episode of the short-lived ABC sitcom Super Fun Night. In 2015, she wrote, produced, and starred in a short film, titled Reflections. She also directed and did various other production duties on another short film, Live Exit Here, for which she additionally starred in, wrote, and produced.

In 2016, Young began portraying Kaya, an Inuk woman, during the third season of Syfy's Z Nation, later becoming a main cast member. She originally auditioned for the role of Sun Mei. That same year, Young was cast in another recurring role as Allison, a lesbian teenager, on the second season of ABC's The Real O'Neals.

In January 2017, Young joined the cast of FXX's Man Seeking Woman in a recurring capacity as Robin for the third season. The following month, Young was featured in the Netflix series Santa Clarita Diet, playing an eponymous deadpan store clerk in all three seasons. In 2017, she was also cast as a series regular in the Fox comedy pilot Thin Ice. The project was later passed on.

Young portrayed Angelica in the 2018 comedy film Blockers. In July 2018, it was announced that Young had joined the main cast of The CW's Arrowverse series Legends of Tomorrow as Mona Wu (previously named Alaska Yu) for the show's fourth season.

In 2020, it was revealed that Young had joined the cast of Mindy Kaling's Netflix series Never Have I Ever.

Personal life 
Young is a first-generation Chinese American. She speaks Mandarin and Cantonese fluently and can understand a few less widely known dialects because of her grandmother. Young has been doing martial arts since about the age of four. She specifically practices Wushu.

Filmography

Film

Television

Music video

References

External links 
 

Living people
American television actresses
21st-century American actresses
American film actresses
American actresses of Chinese descent
Place of birth missing (living people)
American people of Hong Kong descent
California State University, Los Angeles alumni
American wushu practitioners
1998 births